Frame of Mind may refer to:

 Frame of Mind (album), the second solo album by German singer-songwriter Sandy Mölling
 Frame of Mind (film), an American movie about the John F. Kennedy assassination
 "Frame of Mind" (Star Trek: The Next Generation), a 1993 episode of the science fiction television series Star Trek: The Next Generation

See also
State of Mind (disambiguation)